John Larne Robinson (May 3, 1813 – March 21, 1860) was an American politician who served three terms as a U.S. Representative from Indiana from 1847 to 1853.

Biography 
Born near Maysville, Kentucky, Robinson attended the public schools. He moved to Rush County, Indiana, where he engaged in the mercantile business in Milroy, Indiana. He served as county clerk of Rush County from 1841 to 1845.

Congress 
Robinson was elected as a Democrat to the Thirtieth, Thirty-first, and Thirty-second Congresses (March 4, 1847 – March 3, 1853). He served as chairman of the Committee on Roads and Canals (Thirty-first and Thirty-second Congresses).

Later career and death 
He was appointed by President Franklin Pierce as United States marshal for the southern district of Indiana in 1853. He was reappointed to this post by President James Buchanan in 1858 and served until his death. He was appointed brigade inspector of the fourth military district of Indiana in 1854. Robinson served as a trustee of Indiana University at Bloomington from 1856 to 1859.

He died at Rushville, Indiana, March 21, 1860 and was interred in East Hill Cemetery.

References

External links 
 

1813 births
1860 deaths
People from Mason County, Kentucky
United States Marshals
Democratic Party members of the United States House of Representatives from Indiana
People from Rush County, Indiana
19th-century American politicians